George Lincoln Rockwell (March 9, 1918 – August 25, 1967) was an American far-right political activist and founder of the American Nazi Party. He later became a major figure in the neo-Nazi movement in the United States, and his beliefs, strategies, and writings have continued to influence many white supremacists and neo-Nazis.

Born in Bloomington, Illinois, Rockwell briefly studied philosophy at Brown University before dropping out to join the Navy. He trained as a pilot and served in World War II and the Korean War in non-combat roles, achieving the rank of Commander. Rockwell's politics grew more radical and vocal in the 1950s, and he was honorably discharged due to his views in 1960.

In politics, he regularly praised Adolf Hitler, referring to him as the "White savior of the twentieth century". He denied the Holocaust and believed that Martin Luther King Jr. was a tool for Jewish Communists wanting to rule the white community. He blamed the civil rights movement on Jews, and viewed most of them as traitors. He viewed black people as a primitive, lethargic race who desired only simple pleasures, and a life of irresponsibility and supported the resettlement of all African Americans in a new African state to be funded by the U.S. government. As a supporter of racial segregation and white separatism, he agreed with and quoted many leaders of the Black separatism movement such as Elijah Muhammad and early Malcolm X. In his later years, Rockwell became increasingly aligned with other Neo-Nazi groups, leading the World Union of National Socialists.

On August 25, 1967, Rockwell was shot and killed in Arlington by John Patler, a former party member expelled by Rockwell for alleged "Bolshevik leanings".

Biography

Early life
Rockwell was born in Bloomington, Illinois, the first of three children of George Lovejoy Rockwell and Claire (Schade) Rockwell. His father was born in Providence, Rhode Island, and was of English and Scottish ancestry. His mother was the daughter of Augustus Schade, a German immigrant, and Corrine Boudreau, who was of Acadian French ancestry. Both parents were vaudeville comedians and actors. His parents divorced when Rockwell was six years old, and he divided his youth between his mother in Atlantic City, New Jersey, and his father in Boothbay Harbor, Maine.

Rockwell attended Atlantic City High School in Atlantic City, and applied to Harvard University when he was 17 years old. However, he was denied admission. One year later, his father enrolled him at Hebron Academy in Hebron, Maine.

In August 1938, Rockwell enrolled at Brown University in Providence, Rhode Island, as a philosophy major. In his sophomore year, Rockwell dropped out of Brown University and accepted a commission in the United States Navy.

Military service and early career
Rockwell appreciated the order and discipline of the Navy, and attended flight schools in Massachusetts and Florida in 1940. When he completed his training, he served in the Battle of the Atlantic and the Pacific War in World War II. He served aboard the USS Omaha, USS Pastores, USS Wasp and USS Mobile, primarily in support, photo reconnaissance, transport and training functions. Though he never actually flew in combat, he was considered a good pilot and an efficient officer.

On April 24, 1943, Rockwell married Judith Aultman, whom he had met while attending Brown University. Aultman was a student at Pembroke College, which was the coordinate women's college of the university. The couple had three daughters: Bonnie, Nancy, and Phoebe Jean. Rockwell did not get along with his in-laws; he blamed them for not raising Judith to be "docile and compliant", his image of the perfect wife. His marriage was marred with violent arguments and on at least one occasion, he struck his wife.

After the war ended, Rockwell worked as a sign painter out of a small shop on land owned by his father in Boothbay Harbor, Maine. In 1946, he entered the commercial art program at the Pratt Institute in Brooklyn, New York. He and his wife Judith moved to New York City so he could study at Pratt. He did well at Pratt, winning the $1,000 first prize for an advertisement he did for the American Cancer Society. However, he left Pratt before finishing his final year, and moved to Maine to found his own advertising agency.

In 1950, Rockwell was recalled to duty as a lieutenant commander at the beginning of the Korean War. He moved to San Diego with his wife and three children, where he trained pilots in the United States Navy and United States Marine Corps.

Privately, during his time in San Diego, Rockwell became an advocate of Adolf Hitler and a supporter of Nazism. He was influenced by Senator Joseph McCarthy's stance against communism, carmaker Henry Ford's stance on Jews in the media and the entertainment industry, and aviator Charles Lindbergh's stance on Race. Rockwell supported General Douglas MacArthur's candidacy for president of the United States. He adopted the corncob pipe, following MacArthur's example. In 1951, he read the Protocols of the Elders of Zion and Hitler's manifesto Mein Kampf.

In November 1952, Rockwell was transferred to Iceland, where he became a Grumman F8F Bearcat pilot and attained the rank of commander. Because families were not permitted to be with American service personnel stationed there, his wife and children stayed with her mother in Barrington, Rhode Island. His wife filed for divorce the following year. Rockwell attended a diplomatic party in Reykjavík where he met Margrét Þóra Hallgrímsson, the niece of Iceland's ambassador to the United States; they were married on October 3, 1953, by Þóra's uncle, the Bishop of Iceland. They spent their honeymoon in Berchtesgaden, Germany, where Hitler once owned the Berghof mountain retreat in the Bavarian Alps. They made a "pilgrimage" to Hitler's Adlerhorst. Together they had three children: Hallgrímur, Margrét, and Evelyn Bentína. In 1957, Hallgrímsson's father went to the U.S. to take his daughter back to Iceland because he had learned that Rockwell was "one of the most active racists in the United States." She subsequently divorced Rockwell and remarried in 1963.

In September 1955 in Washington, D.C., he launched U.S. Lady, a magazine for United States servicemen's wives. The magazine incorporated Rockwell's political causes: his opposition to both racial integration and communism. The publication had financial problems and he sold the magazine. However, he still aspired to pursue a career in publishing.

Early political activities
After his move to Washington, D.C., in 1955, he gradually became radicalised until, in the words of his biographer, he was "on the farthest fringe of the right wing." In 1957–1958, Rockwell had a series of dreams that ended with him meeting Hitler.

In 1958, Rockwell met Harold Noel Arrowsmith Jr., a wealthy heir and antisemite who provided Rockwell with a house and printing equipment. They formed the National Committee to Free America from Jewish Domination.

On July 29, 1958, Rockwell demonstrated in front of the White House in an anti-war protest against President Dwight D. Eisenhower's decision to send peacekeeping troops to the Middle East, known as Operation Blue Bat. Rockwell and his supporters specifically protested what they supposed was Jewish control of the government. In October 1958, following the Hebrew Benevolent Congregation Temple bombing, Rockwell's home was raided by the police.

Rockwell gained notoriety after Drew Pearson wrote an article describing how Rockwell and his followers dressed in uniforms, armed themselves with guns, and paraded at his home in Arlington County, Virginia.

American Nazi Party

In March 1959, Rockwell founded the World Union of Free Enterprise National Socialists (WUFENS), a name selected to denote opposition to state ownership of property. In December 1959, the organization was renamed the American Nazi Party (later the National Socialist White People's Party, NSWPP), and its headquarters was relocated to 928 North Randolph Street in Arlington, which also became Rockwell's home.

In 1959, he published an Animal Farm-type parody, the long-form poem The Fable of the Ducks and the Hens.

In 1960, as a result of his political activities, the Navy discharged Rockwell one year short of retirement because he was regarded as "not deployable" due to his political views. The proceedings to dismiss him were an extremely public affair. Even though he received an honorable discharge, Rockwell claimed he "had basically been thrown out of the Navy", for which he blamed the Jews.
In order to attract media attention, Rockwell held a rally on April 3, 1960, on the National Mall, where he addressed the crowd with a two-hour speech. A second rally was planned for Union Square in New York City. Mayor Robert F. Wagner Jr. refused to grant him a permit to speak, and he appealed that decision to the New York Supreme Court. When Rockwell emerged in the courthouse rotunda, he was surrounded by a crowd of television reporters. One of the reporters, Reese Schonfeld, interviewed Rockwell, and after Rockwell made anti-Semitic comments, a melee broke out, requiring a police convoy to escort Rockwell from the courthouse. Rockwell, with the aid of the American Civil Liberties Union, eventually won a permit, but it was long after the date of the planned event. Another rally was set for July 4, 1960, again on the National Mall. Rockwell and his men were confronted by a mob and a riot ensued. The police arrested Rockwell and eight party members. Rockwell demanded a trial, and instead, was committed to a psychiatric hospital for thirty days. In less than two weeks, he was released and found mentally competent to stand trial. He published a pamphlet inspired by this experience titled How to Get Out or Stay Out of the Insane Asylum.

On January 15, 1961, Rockwell and a fellow Nazi Party member attempted to picket the local premiere of the film Exodus at the Saxon Theatre in Downtown Boston on Tremont Street while staying at the Hotel Touraine. After Boston Mayor John F. Collins (1960–1968) declined to deny Rockwell the right to picket, members of the local Jewish community organized a counterdemonstration of 2,000 protestors in response on the corner of Tremont and Boylston Streets on the day of the premiere, which forced police to converge on the theater and force Rockwell into a police cruiser that took him to Logan International Airport where Rockwell was then boarded onto a flight to Washington, D.C.

In early 1962, Rockwell planned a rally to celebrate Hitler's birthday in April. In the summer, he attended a camp organized by British Neo-Nazi Colin Jordan in Gloucestershire where they organized the World Union of National Socialists. In September, he awarded one of his members a medal for punching Martin Luther King Jr. in the face.

In the 1964 United States presidential election, Rockwell ran as a write-in candidate, receiving 212 votes. He ran as an independent in the 1965 Virginia gubernatorial election, receiving 5,730 votes, or 1.02% of the total, finishing last among the four candidates.

In the summer of 1966, Rockwell led a counter-demonstration against King's attempt to bring an end to de facto segregation in the white Chicago suburb of Cicero, Illinois. He believed that King was a tool for Jewish Communists who wanted to integrate America. Rockwell believed that integration was a Jewish plot to rule the white community. Rockwell led the American Nazi Party in assisting the Ku Klux Klan and similar organizations during the civil rights movement, in attempts to counter the Freedom Riders and the March on Washington for Jobs and Freedom. But he soon came to believe that the Klan was stuck in the past and ineffective in helping him wage a modern racial struggle.

In 1966, after hearing the slogan "Black Power" during a debate with Black Panther Party leader Stokely Carmichael, Rockwell altered the phrase and started a call for "White Power".

In the spring of 1966, the party began publication of several pamphlets and books, including National Socialist World edited by William Luther Pierce, writings by Rockwell, the periodical Stormtrooper Magazine (originally National Socialist Bulletin), and a propaganda comic book, Here Comes Whiteman!, where the title superhero character battles enemies modeled after racist stereotypes.

In November 1966, the American Civil Liberties Union once again represented Rockwell, defending his right to stage marches or parades in Jewish neighborhoods during Jewish holidays.

Offices
The two-storey farm house Rockwell established as his "Stormtrooper Barracks" was located at 6150 Wilson Boulevard in the Dominion Hills Historic District. It was there that the interview with Alex Haley for Playboy occurred. The house has since been razed, and the property has been incorporated into Upton Hill Regional Park. A small pavilion with picnic tables marks the house's former location. The site of the party headquarters, 928 North Randolph Street in Ballston, Arlington, Virginia, is now a hotel and office building. After Rockwell's death, his successor, Matthias Koehl, relocated the headquarters to 2507 North Franklin Road in Clarendon, Arlington, Virginia. The small building, often misidentified today as Rockwell's former headquarters, is now a coffee shop called Sweet Science Coffee, formerly The Java Shack. Koehl moved the headquarters to New Berlin, Wisconsin, in the mid-1980s.

Record label
In the 1960s, Rockwell attempted to draw attention to his cause by starting a small record label, named Hatenanny Records. The name was based on the word "hootenanny", a term given to folk music performances. The label released a 45 RPM single by a band called Odis Cochran and the Three Bigots with the songs "Ship Those Niggers Back" and "We Is Non-Violent Niggers", and a second single by a group called the Coon Hunters: "We Don't Want No Niggers For Neighbors" backed with "Who Needs A Nigger?". They were sold mostly through mail order and at party rallies.

Hate bus
When the Freedom Riders drove their campaign for the desegregation of bus stations in the Deep South, Rockwell secured a Volkswagen van and decorated it with slogans supporting white supremacy, dubbing it the "Hate Bus" and driving it to speaking engagements and party rallies.

Black separatism
Rockwell got along well with Black separatist leaders, such as Elijah Muhammad (Nation of Islam leader) and Malcolm X, since they shared the goal of racial segregation. In January 1962, Rockwell wrote to his followers that Elijah Muhammad: He also said of Elijah Muhammad "I am fully in concert with their program, and I have the highest respect for Elijah Muhammad." He referred to Elijah Muhammad as "The Black People's Hitler" and donated $20 (worth about $204 in 2022) to the Nation of Islam at their "Freedom Rally" event on June 25, 1961, at Uline Arena in Washington where he and 10–20 of his "stormtroopers" attended a speech by Malcolm X. Rockwell was a guest speaker at a Black Muslim event in the International Amphitheater in Chicago, with Elijah Muhammad and Malcolm X, on February 25, 1962.

Inspired by Black Muslims' use of religion to mobilize people, Rockwell sought collaboration with Christian Identity groups. On June 10, 1964, he met with and formed an alliance with Identity minister Wesley A. Swift. Rockwell used religious imagery, depicting himself as a Christ-like martyr against the Jews. Nazis found a welcome home in Swift's church and church members found a political outlet in the American Nazi Party.

Holocaust denial
Rockwell was a Holocaust denier. In an April 1966 interview for Playboy conducted by journalist Alex Haley, Rockwell stated, "I don't believe for one minute that any 6,000,000 Jews were exterminated by Hitler. It never happened." When asked in a 1965 interview with the Canadian Broadcasting Corporation if the Holocaust were true, Rockwell replied by claiming he had "incontrovertible documentary proof that that's not true."

Death
On August 25, 1967, Rockwell was shot and killed while leaving a laundromat in Arlington, Virginia, only a few yards from where he lived. John Patler, who had been expelled by Rockwell from his party in March 1967 for repeated attempts to inject Marxist ideas into party publications, was convicted of the murder in December 1967, and sentenced to 20 years in prison. He served an initial eight years in prison, and later a further six years following a parole violation. Hearing of his son's death, Rockwell's 78-year-old father said: "I am not surprised at all. I've expected it for quite some time."

Matthias Koehl, the second in command at NSWPP, moved to establish control over Rockwell's body and the assets of the NSWPP, which at the time had some 300 active members and 3,000 financial supporters. Rockwell's parents wanted a private burial in Maine, but declined to fight with the Nazis. On August 27, an NSWPP spokesman reported that federal officials had approved a military burial at Culpeper National Cemetery, Rockwell being an honorably discharged veteran. The cemetery specified that no Nazi insignia could be displayed, and when the 50 mourners violated these conditions, the entrance to the cemetery was blocked in a five-hour standoff, during which the hearse, which had been stopped on railroad tracks near the cemetery, was nearly struck by an approaching train. The next day, Rockwell's body was secretly cremated.

Legacy
Rockwell was a source of inspiration for David Duke when he was young and openly espousing neo-Nazi sentiments. As a student in high school, when Duke learned of Rockwell's murder, he reportedly said "The greatest American who ever lived has been shot down and killed." Richard B. Spencer is another admirer of Rockwell.

Matthew Heimbach said on Rockwell that he was "one of the most gifted orators of the 20th century", and Rockwell's writings and speeches were "the things that worked to bring me to National Socialism".

Two of Rockwell's associates, Matthias Koehl and William Luther Pierce, formed their own organizations. Koehl, who was Rockwell's successor, renamed the National Socialist White Peoples Party (NSWPP) the New Order in 1983 and relocated it to Wisconsin shortly thereafter. Pierce founded the National Alliance and wrote the racist dystopian novel The Turner Diaries. Several other neo-Nazi groups were formed over the years since Rockwell's death, some by his followers and other by newer generations of white supremacists. Some are now defunct.

In popular culture
In the lyrics to the Bob Dylan song "Talkin' John Birch Paranoid Blues", the narrator parodies Abraham Lincoln and Thomas Jefferson as being Communists, and claims that the only "true American" is George Lincoln Rockwell. Quoting the lyrics: "I know for a fact that he hates Commies, 'cause he picketed the movie Exodus."

For their 1972 album Not Insane or Anything You Want To, The Firesign Theatre created a fictional presidential candidate, George Papoon, running on the equally fictional ticket, the Natural Surrealist Light Peoples Party, the name taken as an apparent parody of Rockwell's own group, the National Socialist White Peoples Party.

Marlon Brando portrayed Rockwell in the television miniseries Roots: The Next Generations and won a Primetime Emmy Award for Outstanding Supporting Actor in a Limited Series or Movie for his performance.

In the third season of post-World War II alternate history television show The Man in the High Castle, David Furr portrayed Rockwell as the Reichsmarschall of North America. Nazi-ruled New York City's main airport was named Lincoln Rockwell Airport.

National Lampoon magazine ran a parody of NSWPP propaganda, under the title "Americans United to Beat the Dutch", in their April 1973 "Prejudice" issue, and another in the May 1974 "50th Anniversary" issue, which reportedly cost the magazine an advertising contract with the Dutch brewer Heineken.

A fictional version of Rockwell is featured as a supporting character in James Ellroy's 2019 novel, This Storm, which is part of The Second L.A. Quartet, Ellroy's new novels.

In the 2021 British drama series Ridley Road, Rockwell is portrayed by actor Stephen Hogan.

Publications

 How to Get Out Or Stay Out of the Insane Asylum (1960)
 In Hoc Signo Vinces (1960)
 Rockwell Report (1961)
 This Time the World (1961)
 White Self-Hate: Master-Stroke Of The Enemy (1962)
 White Power (1967)

Albums
 Nazi Rockwell: A Portrait in Sound (1973, posthumous)
 Speech at Brown University, 1966 (1966)
 Speech in the Armory, Lynchburg, Virginia, August 20, 1963 (1963)

See also
John Tyndall (far-right activist)
William Luther Pierce
List of assassinated American politicians

References

Bibliography

External links

Biography of George Lincoln Rockwell at IMDB
"Nazis In America", a commentary and review of Hate by Myrna Estep, Ph.D.
"Blast from the Past: George Lincoln Rockwell" by David Maurer in Daily Progress, August 24, 2003
George Lincoln Rockwell's FBI files, obtained under the FOIA and hosted at the Internet Archive Part 1, Part 2, Part 3

|-

|-

1918 births
1967 deaths
1967 murders in the United States
20th-century American male writers
20th-century American politicians
20th-century American writers
20th-century far-right politicians in the United States
American advertising executives
American agnostics
American anti-communists
American conspiracy theorists
American graphic designers
American Holocaust deniers
American magazine publishers (people)
American Nazi Party members
American people of Acadian descent
American people of English descent
American people of German descent
American people of Scottish descent
American political party founders
American segregationists
Anti-Masonry
Antisemitism in the United States
Assassinated American politicians
Atlantic City High School alumni
Brown University alumni
Candidates in the 1960 United States presidential election
Candidates in the 1964 United States presidential election
Christian Identity
Deaths by firearm in Virginia
Hebron Academy alumni
Male murder victims
Military personnel from Illinois
Neo-Nazi politicians in the United States
People from Bloomington, Illinois
People from Boothbay Harbor, Maine
People murdered in Virginia
Pratt Institute alumni
Sexism in the United States
Thors family
United States Navy personnel of the Korean War
United States Navy officers
United States Navy pilots of World War II
Virginia Independents
White separatists
Writers from Virginia